The Athens Daily Review is a three-time weekly newspaper in Athens, Texas, published mornings on Tuesday, Thursday & Saturday, and distributed throughout Henderson County. It is owned by Community Newspaper Holdings Inc., which acquired the paper from Donrey Media Group in 1998 as part of a 28-paper transaction. It does not publish a Sunday, Monday, Wednesday or Friday edition.

J.B. Bishop and George M. Johnson founded the weekly Athens Review in 1885. After multiple ownership changes, Robert Enoch Yantis converted the paper to a daily in 1901.

References

External links
 Daily Review Website
 CNHI Website

Athens Daily Review
Athens Daily Review